Ulotrichopus nigricans is a moth of the  family Erebidae. It is found in Burundi, Cameroon, the Democratic Republic of Congo (Orientale, North Kivu), Ethiopia, Kenya, Malawi, Rwanda, South Africa and Uganda.

References

Moths described in 1973
Ulotrichopus
Moths of Africa